Martin William Liquori (born September 11, 1949) is a retired American middle distance athlete.

Liquori rose to fame when he became the third American high schooler to break the four-minute mile by running a 3:59.8 in 1967, three years after Jim Ryun first did it.

He grew up in Cedar Grove, New Jersey and attended Essex Catholic High School. After high school, Liquori enrolled at Villanova University. There he was coached by Jumbo Elliott.

Liquori made the U.S. Olympic team in 1968 as a nineteen-year-old freshman. He reached the finals of the 1,500 meter run but suffered a stress fracture and finished 12th. He was the youngest person ever to compete in the final.

In 1969, he finished second to Ryun in the NCAA indoor mile, then won the NCAA and AAU outdoor mile championships by turning the tables on Ryun and beating him. He repeated the AAU outdoor in 1970 and had his best year in 1971, winning the NCAA and AAU outdoor titles, and a gold medal in the 1,500 m at the Pan-American Games. Also in 1969 and 1971, he was ranked number 1 in the world for 1500 meters/mile. In 1977 he was ranked number 1 in 5000 meters and set a U.S. record of 13:15.1 while finishing second to Miruts Yifter in the inaugural World Cup.

On May 16, 1971, Liquori lowered his personal best to 3:54.6 in the Dream Mile in Philadelphia and beat Ryun by a few steps.

But Liquori was injured later that year. He didn't return to competition until 1973.  In 1975, he ran a personal best 3:52.2 in the mile, finishing second to Filbert Bayi (who broke Ryun's world record in that race by 0.1 second with a 3:51.0), and set a United States record of 8:17.12 in the 2 mile.  Liquori retired from competitive distance running in 1980.

He has written an autobiography, On The Run, and he also wrote Guide to the Elite Runner and Home Gym Workout. He was a founder of The Athletic Attic Footwear chain in 1972.
Liquori lives in Gainesville, Florida.  Liquori did commentary at the Munich, Montreal, Sidney, Barcelona, Seoul and Athens Olympic Games and the New York and Boston Marathons. Liquori produced and hosted “Running and Racing” on Espn for 14 years and Fitness Adventures on the Outdoor Life Network. Liquori was diagnosed with chronic lymphocytic leukemia (CLL), which is now in remission.
Liquori has been inducted into
The New Jersey Sports Hall of Fame,
National Track and Field Hall of Fame,
Italian American Hall of Fame,
National High School Hall of Game,
National Distance Running Hall of Fame.
In 2022 Liquori was inducted into the Cosida Academic All American Hall of Fame.

References

Audio interview
TheFinalSprint.com's interview with Olympian Marty Liquori

1949 births
Living people
American male middle-distance runners
Athletes (track and field) at the 1968 Summer Olympics
Essex Catholic High School alumni
Olympic track and field athletes of the United States
Athletes (track and field) at the 1971 Pan American Games
People from Cedar Grove, New Jersey
Sportspeople from Essex County, New Jersey
Track and field athletes from New Jersey
Villanova Wildcats men's track and field athletes
Pan American Games gold medalists for the United States
Pan American Games medalists in athletics (track and field)
Medalists at the 1971 Pan American Games